Mashal can refer to:
 Mashal (allegory), biblical parable or allegory
 Mashal, Iran, village in Gilan Province, Iran

 Communist Party of Nepal (Mashal)
 FK Mashʼal Mubarek, Uzbek football club

People
 Khaled Mashal (born 1956), Palestinian political leader
 Lutfullah Mashal (born 1971), Afghan politician
 Mashal Khan (disambiguation), several people

See also
 Mashaal, 1984 Bollywood film